The 2014 League of Ireland Premier Division was the 30th season of the League of Ireland Premier Division. The division featured 12 teams. Dundalk were champions and Cork City finished as runners-up.

Teams

Stadia and locations

Personnel and kits

Note: Flags indicate national team as has been defined under FIFA eligibility rules. Players may hold more than one non-FIFA nationality.

Overview
The 2014 Premier Division featured 12 teams. Each team played each other three times, for a total of 33 games each. The regular season began 7 March and concluded 24 October. Dundalk won the title on the final day of the season with a 2-0 win at home against Cork City. It was the first time Dundalk had won the Premier Division since 1994–95.

Final Table

Results

Matches 1–22

Matches 23–33

Promotion/relegation playoff
UCD, the eleventh placed team from the Premier Division played off against Galway, the winner of the 2014 First Division play off, to decide who would play in the 2015 Premier Division.
  

Galway won 5–1 on aggregate and were promoted to the Premier Division. UCD are relegated to the First Division.

Top scorers

Awards

Player of the Month

PFAI Players' Player of the Year

PFAI Young Player of the Year

Team of the Year

Television coverage
The rights to 10 games was awarded to Setanta Sports while RTÉ Two will also show games during the season. MNS on RTÉ Two was the highlights programme between 2008 and 2013 but in 2014 it was replaced by a new programme called Soccer Republic which will show match highlights and analysis on each Monday night during the season and will also include UEFA Champions League highlights.

See also

 2014 League of Ireland Cup
 2014 League of Ireland First Division
 2014 St Patrick's Athletic F.C. season

Notes

References

 
League of Ireland Premier Division seasons
1
1
Ireland
Ireland